Wang Chuanjun (born 18 October 1985), also known as Eric Wang, is a Chinese actor and host.

Wang is noted for playing Sekitani Kamiya in the romantic comedy television series iPartment, which enjoyed the highest ratings in China when it was broadcast.

Early life
Wang, born in Shanghai on October 18, 1985, graduated from Shanghai Theatre Academy with a major in acting.
He participated in Dragon TV's reality program My Hero as a contestant.

Filmography

Film

Television series

References

External links

1985 births
Shanghai Theatre Academy alumni
Male actors from Shanghai
Living people
Chinese male stage actors
Chinese male film actors
Chinese male television actors
21st-century Chinese male actors